Dakota County Technical College (DCTC) is a public, two-year technical college in Rosemount, Minnesota, United States. It is located in Dakota County inside the Minneapolis/St. Paul metropolitan area. DCTC belongs to the Minnesota State Colleges and Universities System and is one of five stand-alone technical colleges in the state.

History and governance
Approved by the 1969 Minnesota State Legislature, Dakota County Technical College started in 1970 with 50 students in three programs. The college's permanent site was a research farm formerly owned and operated by the University of Minnesota. The  main building opened in 1973, offering 30 academic programs to nearly 700 students.

At the state level, the Minnesota State Colleges and Universities System Board of Trustees serves as the college's governing authority. In 2011, the school received a 10-year re-accreditation without conditions from the North Central Association of Colleges and Schools Commission on Institutions of Higher Education (NCA-CIHE).

The college has had four presidents in its history. David L. Schroeder served from 1970 to 1999. Ronald E. Thomas, Ph.D., was DCTC's president from 1999 to 2013. Tim Wynes, J.D., who also served as president at Inver Hills Community College, led from 2013 to 2018. Starting July 2, 2018, Michael Berndt served as interim president of the two colleges and was confirmed as permanent president of both institutions in March 2020.

Campus setting
The Rosemount campus houses the majority of the college's instructional programs, which are separated into seven academic departments (see below). The college is going forward with a  prairie grass and wildflower restoration project on the Rosemount campus that is designed and maintained by faculty and students in the Landscape Horticulture program.

DCTC also delivers 10 programs of study in the Business and Management department at the Partners in Higher Education building in Apple Valley Minn., as well as Programming & Development, Microsoft Office, Microsoft Networking, Cisco Networking, Database, IT Foundations, and Web/Graphic Design courses at the IT Training Center in Eagan, Minnesota

Academics

The college has 46 instructional programs under eight academic departments:
 Administrative Support
 Business
 Construction and Manufacturing
 Health and Education
 Marketing and Sales
 STEM Careers
 Transportation
 Visual Arts and Communication
 General Education

The college's General Education department offers individualized studies, general education and transfer curriculum, Minnesota transfer curriculum, and developmental education courses.
Awards offered by DCTC include certificates, diplomas, A.S. degrees and A.A.S. degrees.

Notable programs

Nanoscience Technology

 This program prepares students for careers in the nanobiotech, nanomaterials and nanoelectronics industries. Offered through a partnership with the University of Minnesota, the program gives graduates the skills and knowledge to land jobs in companies and corporations applying nanotechnology to product development, testing, research and development, and manufacturing design.
 The National Science Foundation awarded Dakota County Technical College a $3 million grant to develop the Midwest Regional Center for Nanotechnology Education, or Nano-Link. Situated on DCTC's Rosemount campus, Nano-Link will work to create a skilled workforce of nanotechnologists to enhance economic growth in nanoscale science and technology. The center builds on the success of DCTC's pioneering Nanoscience Technology program, which was established in partnership with the University of Minnesota to prepare graduates for employment in the abundant array of industries where nanoscience applications are rapidly emerging.
 DCTC Nanoscience Technology students, working to promote nano and their program, founded a Web site called Nanostudents.com.

Railroad Conductor Technology

 Featuring a quarter-mile track on campus, the Railroad Conductor Technology program offers a 15-week certificate that includes an eight-week off-campus internship with a railroad. Industry partners include:
 Twin Cities and Western Railroad
 Union Pacific
 Red River Valley and Western Railroad
 Canadian Pacific Railway
 Canadian National
 Progressive Rail
 Minnesota Commercial Railway
 Dakota, Minnesota & Eastern Railroad
 Northern Plains Railroad
 Northern Lines Railway

Business Entrepreneur

 Instructor Bob Voss received the National Association of Community College Entrepreneurship (NACCE) Faculty Member of the Year award in 2008. Associate Dean Christine Pigsley was awarded a $3,600 grant from the Coleman Foundation and Business Entrepreneur student Mary Glock won The New York Times/NACCE Student Essay Contest that same year. The program is housed at the Institute for Business, Innovation & Entrepreneurship, which serves as a resource for business education, small-business support, continuing education and customized training for the southern Twin Cities metropolitan area.

Interior Design

 Connected to professional organizations such as the American Society of Interior Designers (ASID), International Furnishings and Design Association (IFDA), International Interior Design Association (IIDA), National Executive Women in Hospitality (NEWH) and the National Kitchen and Bath Association (NKBA), the Interior Design program is taught by instructors with recognized industry experience.

Landscape Horticulture

 Landscape Horticulture is the only program of its kind in Minnesota nationally accredited by the Professional Landcare Network (PLANET). The program also works with the Minnesota Nursery and Landscape Association (MNLA), allowing students more opportunities to become MNLA Certified Professionals. The program recently constructed a modern, glass-paned greenhouse with solar heating and computerized controls.

Customized training
Partnering with more than 100 area businesses and industries, DCTC offers customized continuing education in a number of areas. In a typical year, more than 6,000 students are enrolled in the college's Customized Training programs. Some noteworthy training projects include:

Business and Management
 Northwest Airlines: $263,945 grant for supervisory management training
 Amerilab Technologies: $309,411 grant for multicultural supervisory training
IT/Computer Technology
 Prometric Training Center: DCTC's IT Training Center delivers Microsoft exams for technology vendors such as Oracle Corporation, Sun Microsystems and CompTIA
Manufacturing
 Foldcraft: $300,000 grant for operational excellence training in manufacturing along with other instruction
 Urologix: $189,000 grant for two-pronged competency training that included pilot and train-the-trainer programs
Public Safety
 Trained and endorsed 1,200 motorcycle riders in 2007
 Trained 600 police officers in emergency vehicle operations, basic and advanced pursuit, and P.I.T. in 2007
 Trained 200 firefighters and emergency medical technicians in emergency response driving proficiency skills in 2007
Transportation
 151 out of 153 (98.6 percent) students passed Truck Driver Training program and earned Class A Commercial Driver's License (CDL)
 Multimillion-dollar facility includes observation deck, three TDT exercise yards and an enclosed, three-mile (5 km) decision driving track

Research
In 2008, DCTC received a $3 million grant from the National Science Foundation to develop the Midwest Regional Center for Nanotechnology Education (Nano-Link) on the DCTC campus. Deb Newberry, the director of the college's Nanoscience Technology program, was appointed to head Nano-Link, which provides resources and support to colleges delivering nanotechnology education and research throughout a five-state region. Six two-year colleges in North Dakota, Minnesota, Wisconsin, Illinois and Michigan partnered to develop this center.

Athletics
Sports programs at DCTC include Women's and Men's soccer:

Head coach: Mark Obarski
Both soccer teams compete as independents at the NJCAA Div. I level in Region 13.
All home games are played on the DCTC main campus in Rosemount, at the Ames Soccer Complex, which was constructed through a partnership between the college and the city of Rosemount with an in-kind donation from Ames Construction.

Women's Fastpitch Softball:

Head coach: Tom Cross
Fastpitch softball competes as an independent at the NJCAA Div. III level in Region 13.

Men's Baseball:

Head coach: Matt Erzar
Baseball competes as an independent at the NJCAA Div. II level in Region 13.

Men's Basketball:
Head coach: Kelly Boe
Inaugural season: Fall 2011
Men's basketball will compete as an independent at the NJCAA Div. II level in  Region 13.

Women's Volleyball:
Head coach: Jen Bowman
Inaugural season: Fall 2011
Women's volleyball will compete as an independent at the NJCAA Div. II level in Region 13.

Campus life

DCTC has a range of student organizations and clubs under the college's Student Life umbrella. Headed by a six-member executive board, the Student Senate manages a budget that funds social activities, scholarships and charitable projects. The Multicultural Student Leadership Organization, DCTC Campus Lions Club, Phi Theta Kappa and SkillsUSA are all active on campus.

Notable alumni

 Derek Chauvin - former Minneapolis police officer and convicted murderer, known for his role in the murder of George Floyd.

References

External links
 Official website
 Official athletics website

Community colleges in Minnesota
Educational institutions established in 1970
1970 establishments in Minnesota
Education in Dakota County, Minnesota
Buildings and structures in Dakota County, Minnesota
NJCAA athletics
Two-year colleges in the United States